Peter Jacobs (born February 27, 1973) is a former professional lacrosse player. Jacobs graduated from Johns Hopkins University in Baltimore, MD in 1995.  In his senior year, he was team captain of the Blue Jays was named first-team All-American in 1995 and lead his team to the Final Four.

NLL career
Peter Jacobs began his National Lacrosse League career in 1996 with the Philadelphia Wings. He played with the Wings until his retirement before the 2009 season, making him one of the longest tenured professional athletes in Philadelphia sports.

Statistics

MLL career
Peter Jacobs retired after playing with the New Jersey Pride for three seasons.  During his tenure he won 524 of 1,016 face-off draws ranking him among the best in the sport.

Statistics

References

External links
Peter Jacobs - Head Coach of the New Jersey Pride at the MLL Website

1973 births
Living people
American lacrosse players
Johns Hopkins Blue Jays men's lacrosse players
Major League Lacrosse coaches
Major League Lacrosse players
Philadelphia Wings players